Vaca Forest Reserve is a nature reserve in the Cayo District of western Belize. It is bordered to the west by Guatemala, to the east by Mountain Pine Ridge Forest Reserve and Nojkaaxmeen Elijio Panti National Park, and to the south by Chiquibul National Park. It forms part of the greater Maya Mountains massif.

Vaca Forest Reserve was established in 1991 and originally consisted of an estimated . In 2011, an additional  were removed. In recent years, the reserve has been seriously degraded by agricultural encroachment, illegal logging, and forest fires.

References

Protected areas of Belize
Protected areas established in 1991
Nature conservation in Belize
Cayo District
Forest reserves